Goodell may refer to:

People
 Charles Goodell (1926–1987), American politician
Charles Goodell (born 1853) (1853–1940), American farmer and politician
 David H. Goodell (1834–1915), American manufacturer and politician
 Grace Goodell, academic
 Henry H. Goodell, 7th president of the Massachusetts Agricultural College
 Jeff Goodell, American journalist and author
 Roger Goodell (born 1959), third commissioner of the post-merger NFL
 William Goodell (disambiguation)

Other uses
 Goodell, Iowa, United States
 Goodell Creek, a tributary of the Skagit River in Washington, U.S.
 Goodell Glacier, Antarctica
 Goodell Hall, an academic building and former library of the University of Massachusetts Amherst

See also
 Goodall (disambiguation)
 Goodell-Pratt (1888–1931), an American tool manufacturing company